Castlemartin was a hundred in Pembrokeshire, Wales.  Initially created by the Marcher Lords of Pembroke in the 14th century from the western part of the pre-Norman cantref of Penfro, it was confirmed by the Laws in Wales Acts 1535-1542.  The hundred, with its capital at Pembroke was early settled by English and Scandinavians, and was a centre of the Norman/English "plantation" in the 12th century.  Since then it has been mostly English-speaking, and part of Little England beyond Wales.

Notes